Molla Kola (also Romanized as Mollā Kolā) is a village in Barik Rud Rural District, in the Central District of Fereydunkenar County, Mazandaran Province, Iran. At the 2006 census, its population was 251, in 64 families.

References 

Populated places in Fereydunkenar County